Peter Henry Laverick (29 January 1939 – 29 January 2013) was an English professional footballer who played as an inside forward.

References

1939 births
2013 deaths
People from Cleethorpes
English footballers
Association football inside forwards
Grimsby Town F.C. players
Bristol City F.C. players
Ross Group F.C. players
English Football League players